Juan Carlos Yunis (born 17 January 1960) is an Argentine former professional tennis player.

A gold medalist at the 1978 Southern Cross Games, Yunis made his only Grand Prix main draw singles appearance at the 1982 Bordeaux Open, but competed more regularly as a doubles player. While partnering his younger brother Francisco Yunis, he was a losing doubles finalist at Bordeaux in 1983.

Yunis is now a resident of Switzerland.

Grand Prix career finals

Doubles: 1 (0–1)

References

External links
 
 

1960 births
Living people
Argentine male tennis players
Argentine emigrants to Switzerland
Competitors at the 1978 Southern Cross Games
South American Games medalists in tennis
South American Games gold medalists for Argentina
South American Games bronze medalists for Argentina